Young Actors Space (YAS) was established in 1979 by Diane Hill Hardin and Nora Eckstein in Los Angeles.  This team was the first in the entertainment industry to establish a performing arts academy for young, working and aspiring actors.  It is well known for being one of the best acting schools for youth in Los Angeles. Patrick Day took over the school in 2007 with his associate Gilmer McCormick.

Notable alumni 
 Chad Allen
 Penn Badgley
 Jessica Biel
 Nichole Bloom
 Samantha Boscarino
 Karan Brar
 Thomas Wilson Brown
 Amanda Bynes
 Brandon Call
 Candace Cameron
 Kirk Cameron
 Sabrina Carpenter
 Scout Taylor Compton
 Miranda Cosgrove
 Brittany Curan
 Zoey Deutch
 Leonardo DiCaprio
 Shannen Doherty
 Jason Dolley
 Stephen Dorff
 Haylie Duff
 Hilary Duff
 Sean Patrick Flanery
 Michael Fishman
 Lyndsy Fonseca
 Brian Austin Green
 Jake Gyllenhaal
 Lukas Haas
 Lucy Hale
 Melora Hardin
 John Huertas
 Christine Lakin
 Tobey Maguire
 Tina Majorino
 Ryan Malgarini
 Xolo Maridueña
 Kellie Martin
 Rochelle Martinez
 Chris Masterson
 Danny Masterson
 Danica McKellar
 Alyson (Aly) Michalka
 Amanda (AJ) Michalka
 Tamera Mowry
 Tia Mowry
 Bailey Noble
 River Phoenix
 Lindsay Price
 Cassidy Rae
 Efren Ramirez
 Molly Ringwald
 Azure Skye
 Emma Stone
 Shiloh Strong
 Hilary Swank
 Kristy Swanson
 David Tom
 Heather Tom
 Nicholle Tom
 Scott Weinger
 Elijah Wood
 Shailene Woodley
 Ryan Wynott
 Ahmet Zappa
 Diva Zappa

Former and current instructors 
Diane Hill Hardin
Nora Eckstein
Patrick Day, Owner 
Gilmer McCormick
Angela Campolla
Bruce Ducat
Natalie Halloran
Maura Corsini
Jule Nelson-Duac
Elise Tullius
Scott Alan Moffitt, Dialect Coach.

References 

 Young Actors Space
 Variety
 Backstage

Performing arts education in the United States
Performing arts in California
Education in Los Angeles